Viliami Hakalo (born 4 December 1987) is a Tongan rugby union player. His usual position is as a Centre.

References

External links
itsrugby.co.uk Profile

1987 births
Living people
Tongan rugby union players
Tonga international rugby union players
Rugby union centres